WNJB may refer to:

 WNJB (TV), a television station (channel 58) licensed to New Brunswick, New Jersey, United States
 WNJB-FM, a radio station (89.3 FM) licensed to Bridgeton, New Jersey, United States